The Mathura lion capital is an Indo-Scythian sandstone capital (a part of a pillar) from Mathura in Northern India, dated to the first decade of the 1st century CE (1–10 CE). It was consecrated under the rule of Rajuvula, one of the Northern Satraps of the region of Mathura.

The capital was unearthed at the Saptarishi mound of Mathura by Bhagwan Lal Indraji in 1869. It is covered with Prakrit inscriptions in the kharoshthi script of northwestern India. The capital was made on the occasion of the funeral of "the illustrious king Muki and his horse" (Muki has been conjectured to be Maues).

The capital describes, among other donations, the gift of a stupa with a relic of the Buddha, by Queen Ayasia, the "chief queen of the Indo-Scythian ruler of Mathura, satrap Rajuvula". The Mathura lion capital, an Indo-Scythian sandstone capital from Mathura in Central India, and dated to the 1st century CE, describes in kharoshthi the gift of a stupa with a relic of the Buddha, by queen Nadasi Kasa, "the wife of Rajuvula" and "daughter of ", who is mentioned as the "daughter of Kharahostes". The lion capital also mentions the genealogy of several Indo-Scythian satraps of Mathura. It mentions Sodasa, son of Rajuvula, who succeeded him and also made Mathura his capital.

The capital also displays at its center a Buddhist triratana symbol, further confirming the involvement of Indo-Scythian rulers with Buddhism.

The inscription indicates support of the Sarvastivadin, against the Mahasamghikas.

It is on display in the South Asia section of the Sir Joseph Hotung Gallery for China and South Asia at the British Museum.

List of inscriptions

In a Latin transliteration of simplified Kharosthi script, the inscriptions read:

Interpretation

Sten Konow, who compiled a definitive listing of Indian Buddhist inscriptions said: "If we bear in mind that mb becomes m i.e mm in the dialect of Kharoshthi dhammapada, and that is used for the common o in Sudasa in the Lion Capital Inscriptions, the Kamuia of the Lion Capital can very well represent a Sanskrit Kambojika ... I shall only add that if Kharoshtha and his father Arta were Kambojas, the same may have been the case with Moga, and we understand why the Kambojas are sometimes mentioned with the Sakas and Yavanas". Many of Konow's readings, his sequence of sentences and some of the interpretation, particularly the connection with king Maues, need to be changed in the light of a new reading of H. Falk.

References

Sources
Baums, Stefan. 2012. "Catalog and Revised Texts and Translations of Gandharan Reliquary Inscriptions." In: David Jongeward, Elizabeth Errington, Richard Salomon and Stefan Baums, Gandharan Buddhist Reliquaries, p. 219–222, Seattle: Early Buddhist Manuscripts Project (Gandharan Studies, Volume 1).
Baums, Stefan, and Andrew Glass. 2002– . Catalog of Gāndhārī Texts, no. CKI 48
British Museum Collection Online Reg. No. 1889,0314.1 

Asian sculptures in the British Museum
1st century in India
Buddhist sculpture
Mathura art
Sculptures of lions
Indian sculpture